Adrian Clive Hayday (born 1956) FMedSci FRS is the Kay Glendinning professor and Chair in the Department of Immunobiology at King's College London and group leader at the Francis Crick Institute in the UK.

Education
Hayday was educated at Queens' College, Cambridge, where he was awarded a Bachelor of Arts degree in natural sciences (biochemistry) in 1978. He went on to complete his PhD in molecular virology of Polyomaviridae at Imperial College London in 1982.

Career and research
Hayday began studying immunology as a postdoctoral researcher in 1982 at Massachusetts Institute of Technology (MIT) supervised by Susumu Tonegawa, where he identified the molecular basis of oncogene activation in Burkitt's lymphoma.  Thereafter, he first described the genes defining gamma-delta T cells, an evolutionarily conserved yet wholly unanticipated set of lymphocytes.  At Yale University, King's College London School of Medicine and the Francis Crick Institute, Hayday established that gamma-delta T cells are distinct from other T cells, commonly monitoring body-surface integrity rather than specific infections.  Their rapid responses to tissue dysregulation offer protection from carcinogenesis, underpinning Hayday's and others' ongoing initiatives to employ the cells for immunotherapy.

Awards and honours
Hayday has received numerous awards, including the William Clyde DeVane Medal, Yale's highest honour for scholarship and teaching. He was elected to head the British Society for Immunology (2005–09), and has formally counselled King's Health Partners, the Pasteur Institute, Kyoto University, the Max Planck Institute, the Allen Institute, MedImmune, the National Institutes of Health, the Wellcome Trust, and Cancer Research UK whose science committee he chairs. He was elected a Fellow of the Royal Society (FRS) in 2016.
He is an honorary member of the British Society for Immunology.

References

Living people
Alumni of Queens' College, Cambridge
Alumni of Imperial College London
Academics of King's College London
Fellows of the Academy of Medical Sciences (United Kingdom)
Fellows of the Royal Society
British immunologists
1956 births
Academics of the Francis Crick Institute
Fellows of King's College London